Olivier Merle (born 14 November 1965 in Chamalières, Puy-de-Dôme) is a former French rugby union footballer. He played as a lock. He was known by several nicknames, including "La Merluche" and "Le Massif Central". He was known for his violent play and after headbutting Ricky Evans the Welsh prop in Paris
causing a ruck to collapse on him breaking his ankle, resulted in his being sued successfully in the courts for damages. This was the first case of its kind and BBC video evidence was used in court. After that he never played for France again.

Merle started his career at ASM Clermont Auvergne, moving then to RC Vichy.

A French championship Title private following a refereeing error with Grenoble 1993 
He also would play for FC Grenoble and despite overpowering pack called the Mammoths of Grenoble his club tilts on the score of 14-11.
A try of Olivier Brouzet is denied to Grenoble and the decisive try by Gary Whetton was awarded by the referee, Daniel Salles, when in fact the defender Franck Hueber from Grenoble touched down the ball first in his try zone.
This error gave the title to Castres. Salles admitted the error 13 years later.
Jacques Fouroux the coach of FC Grenoble in conflict with the Federation and who was already suspicious before the match of the referee cry out conspiracy.

He returns for ASM Clermont Auvergne at the season of 1995/96, where he would stay until 1999/2000. He then moved to RC Narbonne for two seasons, from 2000/01 to 2001/02. His final season was spent at Stade Aurillacois, in 2002/03.

The French lock had 45 caps for France, scoring 6 tries, 30 points in aggregate, from 1993 to 1997. He was selected for the 1995 Rugby World Cup, playing all the five matches. He played four times at the Five Nations, in 1994, 1995, 1996 and 1997, winning it the last time, with a Grand Slam.

Honours
French premiership:
FC Grenoble: 1993 Runners-up

References

External links
Olivier Merle International Statistics

1965 births
Living people
People from Chamalières
French rugby union players
Rugby union hookers
France international rugby union players
Sportspeople from Puy-de-Dôme
ASM Clermont Auvergne players
RC Vichy players
FC Grenoble players
RC Narbonne players